The Saâne is a river of Normandy, France,  in length, flowing through the department of Seine-Maritime.

Geography 
The Saâne has its source in the Pays de Caux in the territory of the hamlet of Varvannes, in the commune of Val-de-Saâne. Taking a northward journey, it flows through the communes of Saâne-Saint-Just, Auzouville-sur-Saâne, Biville-la-Rivière, Brachy, Gueures, Ouville-la-Rivière and Longueil and meets the English Channel between Quiberville and Sainte-Marguerite-sur-Mer. At Longueil, not far from the mouth, the flow is relatively low, at 2.6 m/s, because of the small size of the watershed (270 km), however, at Gueures, on the right bank, a significant tributary, the Vienne river, 15 km in length, joins with the Saane. 
Like most other rivers in the region, the Saâne is classified as a first class river, offering anglers the chance to catch trout and salmon.

See also 
French water management scheme

Bibliography 
 Albert Hennetier, Aux sources normandes: Promenade au fil des rivières en Seine-Maritime, Ed. Bertout, Luneray, 2006

References 

Rivers of France
Rivers of Normandy
Rivers of Seine-Maritime
0Saane